The Blond Ambition World Tour (billed as Blond Ambition World Tour 90) was the third concert tour by American singer Madonna. It supported her fourth studio album Like a Prayer (1989), and the soundtrack album to the 1990 film Dick Tracy, I'm Breathless. The 57-show tour began on April 13, 1990, in Chiba, Japan, and concluded on August 5, 1990, in Nice, France. Additionally, it marked Madonna's first concerts in Sweden and Spain. Originally planned as the Like a Prayer World Tour, it was supposed to be sponsored by soft drink manufacturer Pepsi. However, the company cancelled the contract following the controversy surrounding the music video of "Like a Prayer".

The concert was divided into five thematic acts: Metropolis, inspired by the 1927 German Expressionist film of the same name and the "Express Yourself" music video; Religious, by Catholic themes; Dick Tracy, by the film of the same name and cabaret; Art Deco, inspired by early Hollywood movies and featuring paintings by Polish artist Tamara de Lempicka; and finally, an encore. The art direction was by Madonna's brother Christopher Ciccone, while the costumes were created by French fashion designer Jean-Paul Gaultier. The tour garnered positive reviews from contemporary critics and was a commercial success. It received the "Most Creative Stage Production" award at the Pollstar Concert Industry Awards and grossed over US$62.7 million ($ million in  dollars). Madonna was named the second most successful solo touring act at the time, behind Michael Jackson.

The tour generated controversy due to its use of Catholic imagery and sexual content. Pope John Paul II urged the general public and the Christian community not to attend the tour, calling it "one of the most satanic shows in the history of humanity". The protests resulted the cancelation of one Italian show. In Toronto, the police threatened to arrest Madonna over the performance of "Like a Virgin", which featured her simulating masturbation. Nevertheless, Madonna continued the show unaltered.

A number of concerts were recorded and broadcast, including the tour's final show in Nice, which aired as a special on HBO; afterwards it was released exclusively on LaserDisc under the title Blond Ambition World Tour Live. Directed by Alek Keshishian, Madonna: Truth or Dare (1991) was a documentary film chronicling the tour. Blond Ambition has been noted by critics and authors for its theatricality and fashion, which have left its mark on the work of subsequent pop acts. In 2017, Rolling Stone magazine included the tour on a list of the greatest tours of the past 50 years.

Background 
In January 1989, Pepsi-Cola announced that they had signed a US$5 million deal with Madonna to feature her and her then upcoming single "Like a Prayer" in a television commercial. The deal also included Pepsi sponsorship of Madonna's next concert tour, announced at the time as the Like a Prayer World Tour. Madonna wanted to use the commercial to launch the song globally before its actual release — the first time this had been done in the music industry. Pepsi also benefited from having their product associated with Madonna. Titled "Make a Wish", the commercial had its premiere during the global telecast of the 31st Grammy Awards on February 22, 1989, with an estimated 250 million people around the world viewing it. The following day, Madonna released the music video for "Like a Prayer" on MTV. Featuring a church and Catholic images such as stigmata, Ku Klux Klan-style cross burning and the singer kissing a black saint. Religious groups worldwide, including the Holy See, immediately protested against, what they saw as, blasphemous use of Christian imagery and called for a boycott of Pepsi and PepsiCo's subsidiaries. As a result, Pepsi withdrew the commercial and canceled Madonna's sponsorship contract.

Sire Records officially announced the Blond Ambition World Tour on November 16, 1989; Madonna's performance of the single "Express Yourself" at the MTV Video Music Awards was deemed a "preview". She described the tour as "much more theatrical than anything I've ever done [...] I know that I'm not the best singer and I know that I'm not the best dancer. But, I can fucking push people's buttons and be as provocative as I want. This tour's goal is to break useless taboos". The tour promoted Madonna's fourth album Like a Prayer and the Dick Tracy soundtrack I'm Breathless.

Development

Conception and rehearsals 

According to author J. Randy Taraborrelli, Madonna had "complete control over virtually every aspect of the tour". The singer's brother Christopher Ciccone was selected as the tour's art director. He wrote in his autobiography Life with My Sister Madonna that she called him and said, "I'm going on tour, and of course I want you to dress me, but you think you ought to design the stage and art-direct the show as well". The tour's troupe was made up of seven dancers, two backup singers and eight musicians. Vincent Paterson, who had worked with the singer on the Pepsi commercial and the "Express Yourself" music video, was appointed co-director and choreographer. Auditions for dancers took place in New York and Los Angeles. An advertisement was put on Daily Variety magazine by choreographer Karole Armitage, it read: "Open auditions for fierce male dancers who know the meaning of troop style, beat boy and vogue. Wimps and Wanna-Bes need not apply!". Luis Camacho and Jose Gutierez Xtravaganza, who had previously worked with Madonna on the video for her single "Vogue", were the first to be selected. After sending a video tape to the singer, Madonna invited the pair to the Tracks nightclub for an informal audition. After his audition, dancer Carlton Wilborn was also asked by Madonna to meet her at a nightclub. He pointed out that she was "looking for very confident people – the best of the best – so I was acutely aware of how I was presenting myself. When I made the cut, I knew it was a huge opportunity"; he described the rehearsals as being "like boot camp". The rest of the dancers selected were Oliver Crumes, Kevin Stea, Gabriel Trupin and Salim Gauwloos. Paterson stated that "instead of just presenting songs, Madonna and I wanted to combine fashion, Broadway, rock and performance arts".

To allow greater movement while dancing and singing, she used a hands-free radio-frequency headset microphones, with the headset fastened over the ears or the top of the head, and the microphone capsule on a boom arm that extended to the mouth. Because of her prominent usage, the microphone design came to be known as the "Madonna mic". Other personnel included Jai Winding as the music director, John Draper as the tour's manager and Chris Lamb as the production manager. Rehearsals took place at the Walt Disney Studios in Burbank, California.

Wardrobe and staging 

For the wardrobe, the singer contacted French designer Jean Paul Gaultier; she was attracted to the designer's "irreverence and humor" and sent him a handwritten letter asking him to design the tour's costumes. Gaultier happily accepted. He was already an admirer of Madonna and expressed admiration for the fact that "when she was not so famous, she made her clothes herself [...] the visible bra, the transparencies, the crucifixes as jewelry". Madonna and Gaultier took three months to finalize the details of the costumes; they first met at New York City's Carlyle Hotel, with additional meetings taking place in Paris' Bofinger restaurant, Balajo Club, Zoopsie nightclub and Théâtre Equestre Zingaro. Gaultier remembers this period as one of intense stress, claiming to have gotten through "350 aspirins and 1,500 sketches" before the singer approved of his designs. Tour backup singer and dancer Niki Haris later recalled that "with Madonna, it always comes down to clothes and shoes". The result were two corsets with conical-shaped cups, one was peach-colored and the other solid gold. Gaultier explained that the idea first came when, as a child, his grandmother took him to an exhibit where "they had a corset on display. I loved the flesh color, the salmon satin, the lace. The gold conical bra was just an extension of that idea". Other costumes created included a pin-striped suit, a green and white striped vaudeville-style corset, a black mini-dress trimmed and stitched with a stuffed West African stork called the marabou, a black clergyman's robe with a neon crucifix and a cage vest. To avoid any incidents, every piece was double sewn with elastic threads. For the Asian and North American legs of the tour, the singer wore a synthetic ponytail clip on extension, which was replaced by a curly hairstyle on the European leg.

Construction for the stage cost approximately US$2 million. The stage was 80 x 70 feet long and needed over a hundred crew members to mount it and 18 trucks to haul it around. The centerpiece was a huge hydraulic platform, in which Madonna ascended at the beginning of each concert. The show was split into different thematic sections, each one with its own specific settings, divided by a curtain going up and down. To come up with the designs of each section, Madonna and her brother studied fashion and architecture from the 1920s, 30s and 40s. It was the singer's idea to incorporate the movie Dick Tracy onto the tour; "it's a great opportunity for me [...] Most people don't associate me with movies. But I know I have a much bigger following than Warren does and a lot of my audience isn't even aware of who he is", she recalled. The first section, which was inspired by Metropolis and the "Express Yourself" music video, featured several funnels billowing smoke, steel piping, cables hanging above and a flight of stairs in the middle. At the end of this section ends, the curtain drops to the floor and gives way to the second one, where the stage became a boudoir and featured the singer on a red velvet bed. The third section, which was church-themed, had a large arc of Corinthian columns and votive candles. Halfway through one of the performances, a large scrim depicting a stained glass window was lowered from the ceiling. The fourth act, which featured scenic elements inspired by Art Deco skyscrapers, had a grand semicircular double staircase in the middle and backdrops that were cutout reproductions of Tamara de Lempicka's paintings. Props included a grand piano and a huge cross lit with purple and orange lights. Belgian electronic music band Technotronic was signed as the opening act.

Concert synopsis 

The show was separated into five different sections: Metropolis, Religious, Dick Tracy, Art Deco, and an encore. It began with "Express Yourself", and included a lyrical sample from "Everybody" (1982) during the introduction. Seven bare-chested male dancers appeared from behind a steel structure and did a choreographed routine on the stage; towards the end Madonna appeared on a rising platform atop a flight of stairs. She was dressed in a pin-striped suit with holes cut in it, so that her brassiere poked out of them. Underneath she wore the Gaultier conical corset. Accompanied by Niki Haris and Donna De Lory, her two backup singers and dancers, Madonna did a straightforward vocal rendition of the track, and an elaborate choreography, which included voguing, humping and simulated masturbation. The next number, "Open Your Heart", featured  Madonna performing a choreographed routine with a chair while a muscular dancer watched her from afar. For "Causing a Commotion" the singer wore a colorful cycling jacket and wrestled Haris and De Lory. The final song of the act was "Where's the Party". Three male dancers did an elaborate choreography while Madonna left the stage for a costume change.

The Religious section began with a slow and sultry sitar-based version of "Like a Virgin". Madonna was decked out in the gold Gaultier corset and simulated masturbating on top of a red velvet bed. She was flanked by two male dancers wearing tights and gold pointy bras. For "Like a Prayer", Madonna wore a black robe and knelt down in the middle of the stage, which was surrounded by votive candles, while her dancers, who were dressed like priests and nuns, gyrated around her and uttered the phrase "Oh my God" several times. Next, she performed "Live to Tell" on a prie-dieu. Halfway through the song, she started singing "Oh Father" while Carlton Wilborn in a black frock played the role of a priest. An energetic performance of "Papa Don't Preach" closed this section. "Sooner or Later" opened the Dick Tracy act. Madonna sat atop a grand piano and wore a cabaret-themed corset under a long black robe. For the energetic "Hanky Panky", she was joined by Haris, De Lory and a dancer dressed as Dick Tracy. At the end of the performance, she would tell the audience: "You all know the pleasures of a good spanking, don't you? [...] When I hurt people, I feel better, you know what I mean?". "Now I'm Following You" closed the act; Madonna danced with the Dick Tracy dancer to a pre-recorded version of the song, while six other dancers in yellow trenchcoats did a kick line.

The Art Deco act began with "Material Girl"; performed in a strong midwestern accent, Madonna, Haris and De Lory sat beneath beauty parlor hair dryers and wore fluffy pink dresses with dollar signs underneath bathrobes. Towards the end of the performance, they would take fake dollar bills from inside their bosoms and throw them to the crowd. The next song performed was "Cherish". It featured Madonna playing the harp and her male dancers dressed up as mermen. Madonna ended the section with "Into the Groove", performed with leather-clad dancers, and "Vogue". The latter featuring various cutouts of Tamara de Lempicka's paintings as backdrops, with the singer and the dancers wearing black spandex and doing the original choreography from the music video. The first encore, "Holiday", had Madonna dressed in a polka-dotted blouse with matching flounces at the bottom of white trousers. The tour's final performance was "Keep it Together"; it featured lyrical samples of Sly and the Family Stones "Family Affair" (1971). It started with dancers appearing on the stage, with chairs on their back. Madonna came on dressed in an all-black ensemble involving a cage vest, skintight shorts, knee-pads and bowler hat. She started singing "Family Affair", then midway through the song switched back to "Keep It Together". During the mid-section of the song, her and the dancers performed a choreography with the chairs. At the end, all the musicians, dancers and collaborators came to say goodbye to Madonna and disappeared into a hole on the stage. The singer was left alone to finish with a repeat of her line "Keep people together forever and ever".

Critical reception 

The tour received generally positive reviews from critics. In his book Madonna: An Intimate Biography, J. Randy Taraborrelli wrote that "brazenly sexual dance numbers and religious imagery commingled in a fast-paced, tightly choreographed unforgettable extravaganza". Similar thoughts were shared by Rolling Stones Barry Waters. The Los Angeles Times said it highlighted "just how deep Madonna's repertoire has become over the years". From the same publication, Robert Hilburn opined that "Madonna's Blond Ambition show comes equipped with enough high-concept, Broadway-like choreography and stage design to satisfy the most demanding stargazer in a crowd equally populated by style-conscious wanna-be's and simply curious mainstream fans". The Pittsburgh Presss Ron Miller called it "big, glitzy and full of elaborate production numbers and costume changes". Also from The Pittsburgh Press, David Hinckley compared it to a "flashy, high-energy Broadway production". In his review of the show on May 7, 1990 at Dallas' Reunion Arena, Tom Maurstad felt that "it wasn't so much a concert as it was a musical extravaganza, with each song functioning more as its own production"; however, he criticized the singer for mixing up Dallas with Houston when addressing the crowd. Peter Buckley, author of The Rough Guide to Rock, praised the production and said it was "an imaginative take of the staging of a stadium gig". Montgomery Brower and Todd Gold, from People, called it a "105-minute hullabaloo amazing for its breadth of controversy". For Gay Times magazine's Scott Anderson, "despite all that's happening on the stage it still felt like a concert, and despite the precession of the choreography, it had a certain rawness to it, it felt playful and spontaneous". Richard Harrington from The Washington Post, hailed the tour as "a roadshow version of the videos that have made her one of the world's biggest stars".

Newsdays Frank DeCaro noted that "in just over an hour and a half, [Madonna] juggles as many looks as she does a month's worth of international magazine covers", concluding that "Blond Ambition is a night at the Roxy, the Pyramid and Studio 54 in its heyday, all rolled into one". From the same publication, John LeLand said that "the advance word was that it was shocking and outrageous [...] But what brought most of the crowd together at Nassau Coliseum Monday night, was that we weren't shocked. Amused, tickled, stimulated or diverted, maybe, but not shocked or outraged". Sujata Massey from The Baltimore Sun highlighted the "passionate" performances, Madonna's outfits and the "sexy" chatter. Greg Kot from the Chicago Tribune felt that "though the music certainly offered a few shake-your-booty thrills, it was Madonna the performer, dancer, rogue philosopher and smart-mouthed comic who made the evening memorable". He praised the singer's stage presence and pointed out the performance of "Like a Virgin" for being "both seductive and hilarious". Kot concluded his review: "nothing about this production was second-rate. Each of the evening's 18 songs was expertly choreographed, and the lighting, staging and costuming were often spectacular". Writing for Maclean's, Brian D. Johnson expressed that "[Madonna] performs with the ruthless, aerobic efficiency of a circus girl. As a singer, she has limited range. But she knows how to seduce a pop song [...] as she whips through her circus repertoire of poses, the show unfolds like a kaleidoscope of sexual decadence".

In a mixed review, Jon Pareles from The New York Times wrote that "Madonna might be testing taboos, but she's hardly breaking new ground in rock theatrics", also criticizing the use of lip sync; "she would clearly rather lip-sync than risk a wrong note. It makes the concert airless and off-putting". Three years later, the same author said that "with Blond Ambition she was pop's least flirtatious sex symbol", and deemed it "proudly uningratiating". In his review of the show in Gothenburg, Luis Hidalgo from El País said that "the big question is knowing if Madonna sings live or not completely [...] The non-existence of natural gasping and agitated breaths reinforces this hypothesis, strongly denied by the organization". Author Lucy O'Brien was critical of the Dick Tracy act, calling it "the least dynamic part of the show". Blond Ambition won the award for Most Creative Stage Production at the 1990 Pollstar Concert Industry Awards, and was also nominated in the Major Tour of the Year category.

Commercial performance 
The tour was attended by 800,000 people around the world, with initial reports of a US$19 million gross. The first three concerts at Japan's Chiba Marine Stadium were attended by 35,000 people each, grossing US$4.5 million. All her Japanese concerts had sold out within days of the tickets going on sale, earning the star US$37 million just from the Japanese leg of her tour. In North America, 482,832 tickets were sold in the first two hours during the pre-sale, grossing US$14 million. The first four dates alone were reported to have grossed almost US$1.5 million. In Los Angeles, the tour set a record at the Memorial Sports Arena; tickets for the first three concerts were sold out in 45 minutes, and grossed US$456,720 dollars, becoming the highest grossing musical event of all time in the history of the arena. The proceeds of the last American date in New Jersey, over US$300,000, were donated to the nonprofit organization amfAR; the show was dedicated to Madonna's friend Keith Haring who died of AIDS.

The tour proved to be successful in Europe as well. The single concert in Rome was attended by 30,000 people. In Spain, tickets went on sale on 11 June 1990; prices ranged from 1,200 to 4,000 pesetas. The single concert at Madrid's Vicente Calderón Stadium attracted 50,000 fans, while in Vigo only 23,000 of the 40,000 tickets were sold. The single concert at Gothenburg's Eriksberg Docks attracted 55,000 people, one of the biggest crowds for a concert in Gothenburg at the time. Upon completion, the tour was reported to have grossed a total of US$62.7 million ($ million in  dollars) from 57 concerts. Billboard reported that a percentage of ticket proceeds would be donated to the charity organization Cities In Schools, a high school drop-out prevention program. Madonna was named the second most successful solo touring act of the time, behind only Michael Jackson.

Controversies 

The tour was subject to controversy due to its sexual and Catholic imagery. In Italy, a private association of Roman Catholics called for a boycott of the shows in Rome and Turin; Pope John Paul II urged the general public and the Christian community not to attend the concert, calling it "one of the most satanic shows in the history of humanity". The Vatican's newspaper L'Osservatore Romano deemed it "sinful, blasphemous" and "a complete disgrace", while the Famiglia Domani, a private association of conservative Catholics, criticized its eroticism and called it "shameful". Madonna held a press conference in Rome's Leonardo da Vinci–Fiumicino Airport defending herself and the tour: "I am Italian American and proud of it... The tour in no way hurts anybody's sentiments. It's for open minds and gets them to see sexuality in a different way. Their own and others [...] Like theater, [Blond Ambition] asks questions, provokes thought and takes you on an emotional journey, portraying good and bad, light and dark, joy and sorrow, redemption and salvation". Nonetheless, the protests had effect and a planned second show in the city's Stadio Flaminio was canceled due to low ticket sales and a threatened general strike by labor unions. Roman newspaper Il Messaggero dismissed the controversy with a lukewarm review; "A lot of noise over nothing", read the headline.

In Toronto, the tour's explicit overtone also caused problems. During the first show at the city's SkyDome on May 27, the crew received a visit from the local police who threatened to arrest the singer for "lewd and indecent display", specifically the masturbation scene during the performance of "Like a Virgin". However, according to Rolling Stone, no charges were made after the tour's manager gave the police an ultimatum: "Cancel the show, and you'll have to tell 30,000 people why." The show was unaltered and Madonna began the concert by asking the crowd "do you believe in artistic expression and freedom of speech?", and later issued a statement saying she was willing to be arrested to protect her freedom to "express myself as an artist". Frank Bergen, a Toronto police officer at the time, recalled that the claims were led by a retired police officer and a crown attorney with a "strong position" against Madonna and the tour. He also said despite the police being depicted as "real knobs" on the Madonna: Truth or Dare documentary, he felt they weren't acting that way. Kevin Stea, one of the dancers, said the troupe was willing to be arrested over the performance, calling it "the most powerful moment I ever felt with Madonna. As a team we were all together".

Broadcasts and recordings 

The last concert in Nice, France, was recorded and broadcast on HBO as Live! Madonna: Blond Ambition World Tour 90. The rights to the special were bought by HBO for US$1 million, and was advertised as "America's No.1 female pop star in a live-by-satellite performance of one of the summer's biggest pop music events". According to the Chicago Tribune, it was not a pay-per-view special as the channel wanted to distinguish itself from its pay-TV rival, Showtime. The transmission gave HBO a record for the highest ratings ever for an original program at the time; around 4.5 million people tuned in. It was considered too racy for television, and during the concert Madonna told the cameras: "You know what I have to say to America? Get a fucking sense of humor, okay?". Soon after, the concert was released exclusively on LaserDisc, entitled Blond Ambition World Tour Live; it earned Madonna her very first Grammy win for Best Long Form Music Video. One of the Yokohama dates was also recorded and released exclusively in Japan under the title Blond Ambition – Japan Tour 90. In addition to these releases, Spanish broadcaster TVE recorded the concert in Barcelona and aired it in 30 countries. L’Osservatore Romano felt the broadcast was a violation of "good sense, good taste and decency". In England, BBC Radio 1 broadcast the full show from Wembley Stadium, which led to controversy over the profanity Madonna used live on air.

The documentary film which chronicled the tour, Madonna: Truth or Dare (known as In Bed with Madonna outside of North America), was directed by Alek Keshishian and released in theaters on May 10, 1991, grossing over US$15 million. The singer approached Keshishian about doing an HBO special on her and the tour; the director, who found the backstage scene to be "a Fellini-esque dysfunctional family", persuaded the singer to do an actual film focused on that, with interspersed footage of some performances. It received generally positive reviews; Peter Travers from Rolling Stone wrote that "you may not leave Truth or Dare loving Madonna, but you'll respect her as a force of nature". In 2018, it was named by The Guardian as the greatest music documentary of all time, with Ryan Gilbey claiming that "[Alek] Keshishian couldn't have trained his cameras on Madonna at a better time". However, Madonna was nominated for a Razzie Award for Worst Actress for her role in the film. It was released on video by LIVE Entertainment on October 9, 1991. The 2016 documentary Strike a Pose chronicled the life of six of the dancers after the tour finished.

Legacy

In the work of other artists 
Blond Ambition has been noted for its theatricality and fashion, something uncommon for concerts at the time. Drew Mackie from People, said that "Blond Ambition changed the pop-culture landscape". The fact that the show was divided into different thematic acts represented, according to the author, "not only a level of creative planning unusual for concerts at the time but also the sheer volume of material Madonna had to work with". Lucy O'Brien noted that the singer had previously explored "conceptual musical theatre as concert" on 1987's Who's That Girl World Tour, but it wasn't until Blond Ambition that "art, spectacle and dance really came together". Courtney E. Smith wrote in her book Record Collecting for Girls: Unleashing Your Inner Music Nerd, One Album at a Time that "[Blond Ambition] forever changed audience expectations for pop concerts. Even if you didn't go, you're probably familiar with that tour". Co-Director/Choreographer Vincent Paterson recalled that Madonna's goal was to "break every rule we can. She wanted to make statements about sexuality, cross-sexuality and the church. And she did". Dancer Luis Camacho said that Madonna "set the stage" for concerts and shows that followed. Scott Anderson concluded that the Blond Ambition Tour changed the way artists present and perform in stadiums and arenas. According to Christopher Rosa from VH1, the tour solidified Madonna's status as a "cultural tour-de-force and groundbreaking pop artist". Gina Vivinetto from The Advocate named it Madonna's best tour and wrote that "until [Blond Ambition] came along, we had no idea what a live concert could be". For The Odyssey's Rocco Papa, "[Blond Ambition] offered a level of theatricality not previously seen in pop shows" and "set the standard for all pop concerts that followed. Madonna and choreographer Vincent Patterson put together routines that pushed boundaries". Spin deemed it the sixth greatest concert of the last 35 years. Ilana Kaplan wrote that it "was more than just shock factor: It was meant to transform live pop music", and also that it helped Madonna "reclaim her narrative and power as the tabloids (wrongfully) deemed her a villain". Idolators Mike Wass considered it the "blueprint for modern concerts [...] The Queen of Pop really shook things up by giving choreography, costumes and production as much attention as the live vocals". Writing for The Guardian, professor Sarah Churchwell wrote that the tour allowed Madonna to "catapult[ed] herself into megastardom, shaping the music industry" and establishing herself as "the mother of today’s multimedia concert extravaganzas".

Rolling Stone noted that Madonna had "reinvented the pop megatour itself"; in 2017, the magazine included Blond Ambition on their list of "The 50 Greatest Concerts of the Last 50 Years". Similarly, Q magazine named it one of the "10 Greatest Gigs of All Time"; Sylvia Patterson explained that "in spring 1990, Madonna was not only the most regonisable woman on Earth, but the most gloriously dynamic pop force on the planet. [...] Blond Ambition, her third major tour, was acknowledged as the first-ever global pop tour to use Broadway theatre production values with sets and a narrative 'arc'". On a similar note, Billboards Jon O'Brien commented that "no longer were audiences content to watch their pop idol simply play the hits. Elaborate production values and strong narrative arcs soon became just as integral to the superstar tour as the music itself". The Guardians Mark Beaumont wrote that it "set a new bar for confrontational theatricality that only greater shock tactics could ever challenge". In 2022, Alim Kheraj from The Guardian, named the tour one of the 50 gigs that changed music, for "altering the blueprint for modern pop shows with this combination of narrative, choreography, high production values and fashion. A taboo-busting exploration of sexuality and religion only solidified its legacy". Ramona Liera Schwichtenberg, Deidre Pribram, Dave Tetzlaff and Ron Scott, authors of The Madonna Connection: Representational Politics, Subcultural Identities, And Cultural Theory, wrote that the tour revealed the "underlying contradictory tensions within dominant American culture vis-à-vis sexuality" and that it violated too many "fragile, middle-class sexual codes and boundaries".

It has also left its mark on the work of subsequent pop acts; NMEs El Hunt wrote: "Think of the whips and chains of Rihanna's 'S&M', Ariana Grande's 'Side to Side' and countless other pop greats who emerged post-Madonna, and traces of Blond Ambition linger in their every move". The music video for Lady Gaga's 2010 single "Alejandro" was deemed a "visual love letter" to Madonna and the tour. Kylie Minogue's 1991 Let's Get to It Tour was criticized for its similarities to Blond Ambition and branded a "parody". Further influence has been recognized by critics on Michael Jackson's 1992–93 Dangerous World Tour, as well as on the live performances of Pink, Beyoncé, Lady Gaga, Katy Perry, Miley Cyrus, Marilyn Manson, Nicki Minaj and Justin Bieber. In order to record the actors' expressions up close, filmmakers working on James Cameron's Avatar (2009) had them wear black headsets with small square cameras positioned in front of their mouths ―similar to the microphones used by Madonna on the tour; producer Jon Landau explained that "if [Madonna] can be bouncing around with a microphone in her face and give a great performance [...] we thought, 'Let’s replace that microphone with a video camera'".

In fashion and popular culture 

The tour has also influenced the fashion world. In her book Fashion Details: 1,000 Ideas from Neckline to Waistline, Pockets to Pleats, Macarena San Martin called the Gaultier conical corset "an emblematic symbol of fashion in the early 90s". Billboards Gregory DelliCarpini Jr. stated that the corset "redefined the female silhouette and moved many designers to add some edge to their undergarments". Entertainment Weeklys Nina Terrero said that Madonna "birthed a major fashion moment" when she performed on tour wearing the corset. For Harold Koda, the singer's use of the corset, an undergarment, as outerwear suggested that "an explicit control of one's image might transform, or at least destabilize, the patriarchal relationships of voyeuristic male and sexually objectified female". For Adam Geczy and Vicki Karaminas, the conical corset over a male suit represented both the breasts and the phallus. They concluded that "in the interval of a decade, she transmogrified from virgin to dominatrix to Übermensch [...] Until then, only Bowie had multi-morphed; Madonna was the first woman to do so". Rebecca Dana from The Daily Beast stated that the corset's "genius" lied in its subversion of traditional femininity: "Soft becomes hard; curvy becomes phallic; the engine of maternity transforms into a weapon—it's a Freudian nightmare".

The conical corset has inspired and been recreated by many contemporary artists, including Lady Gaga, Katy Perry and Rihanna. In 2001, one of the corsets was sold at an auction for US$21,105. The corset was reinvented by Gaultier for Madonna's 2012 MDNA Tour in a cage-like leather style; "what I have done this time is a nod to the conical bra corset of the Blond Ambition tour but reinterpreted in 3-D, in patent leather on the outside with metallic leather on the inside. It's all about masculine and feminine", the designer recalled. While reviewing the tour on its 30th anniversary, Liam Hess from Vogue wrote that the conical corset "is so embedded within the canon of both pop music and fashion that it now requires little introduction", and that it represented a pop star in control. Hess concluded that its most lasting influence is that it allowed female pop performers "to channel their sexuality through the outfits they choose to wear without shame, and on their own terms". The synthetic ponytail the singer wore during the Asian and American legs became a fashion trend among the youth, with People magazine reporting that many fans were showing up at the concerts with similar hairdos.

Of the singer's look with the corset and ponytail, Mark Elliott expressed that "no other artist would ever inhabit an image so immortal from a live show". It is now considered one of Madonna's most iconic looks. The look was then referenced by actress Stephanie Faracy in the 1993 film Hocus Pocus. On the fifth episode of the second season of American television series Pose, "What Would Candy Do?", the characters Damon (Ryan Jamaal Swain) and Ricky (Dyllón Burnside) audition to be back-up dancers for the tour. While discussing the episode, W Magazine's Brooke Marine argued that "as much as that tour is known for Madonna's famous Jean-Paul Gaultier cone bra, it was her dancers who made the whole spectacle culturally relevant [...] If it weren’t for the queer men of color who danced on the tour, Blond Ambition would not have been as effective or as subversive". Mark Beaumont expressed that the main taboo Madonna broke with Blond Ambition was "that of feminine sexuality as strength rather than titillation, as something owned by the artist not cashed in by the svengalis", while according to Vultures David Goldberg, "everything Madonna can be traced down to this cultural convergence: fashion, religion, sex, spectacle, and, of course, controversy".

Set list 
Set list and samples adapted per Madonna's official website and the notes and track listing of Blond Ambition World Tour Live.

Act 1: Metropolis
 "Express Yourself" 
 "Open Your Heart"
 "Causing a Commotion"
 "Where's the Party"
Act 2: Religious
 "Like a Virgin"
 "Like a Prayer" 
 "Live to Tell" / "Oh Father"
 "Papa Don't Preach"
Act 3: Dick Tracy
 "Sooner or Later"
 "Hanky Panky"
 "Now I'm Following You"
Act 4: Art Deco
 "Material Girl"
 "Cherish"
 "Into the Groove" 
 "Vogue"
Act 5: Encore
 "Holiday" 
 "Keep It Together"

Tour dates

Canceled dates

Personnel 
Adapted from the Blond Ambition World Tour 90 program.

Band 
Madonna – creator, vocals
Niki Haris – vocals
Donna De Lory – vocals
Jai Winding – keyboards
Kevin Kendrick – keyboards
Carlos Ríos – guitar
Darryl Jones – bass
Jonathan Moffett – drums
Luis Conte – percussions

Dancers and choreographers 
Luis Camacho – dancer
Oliver Crumes – dancer
Salim "Slam" Gauwloos – dancer
Jose Gutierez Xtravaganza – dancer
Kevin Stea – dancer
Gabriel Trupin – dancer
Carlton Wilborn – dancer
Vincent Paterson – choreographer

Wardrobe 
Jean Paul Gaultier – designer
Marlene Stewart – additional costumes

Crew 
Madonna – director
Christopher Ciccone – artistic director
Jai Winding – music director
Freddy DeMann – personal manager
John Draper – tour manager
Chris Lamb – production manager
Mike Grizel – road manager
John McGraw – set designer
Peter Morse – lighting director
Joanne Gair – make-up, styling
Julie Cherrow – massage therapist
Robert Parr – fitness trainer
Pamela Gatell – ambiance
Liz Rosenberg – publicity
Tom Hudak – stage manager
Mark Micoli – video director

See also 
 List of highest-grossing concert tours

References

Bibliography

External links 

Madonna.com > Tours > Blond Ambition World Tour

Madonna concert tours
Obscenity controversies in music
1990 concert tours